Gurranang is a locality between the towns of Casino and Grafton on the Summerland Way in northern New South Wales, Australia. The North Coast railway passes through, and a railway station was provided between 1905 and 1972. At the 2006 census, Gurranang had a population of 170 people.

References

Towns in New South Wales
Northern Rivers